Ibrahim  (Arabic synonym of "Abraham") is the 14th chapter (surah) of the Qur'an with 52 verses (āyāt).

The surah emphasizes that only God knows what goes on inside a man's heart, implying we must accept each other's words in good faith (14:38).

Regarding the timing and contextual background of the revelation (asbāb al-nuzūl), it is a "Meccan surah", which means it is believed to have been revealed in Mecca, instead of later in Medina. It was revealed around 2-3 years before Hijrah, in a later stage of Muhammad preaching in Mecca when persecution of him and fellow Muslims had become severe.

Summary
1 The Quran given to guide men out of darkness into light
2-3 A grievous punishment awaits the infidels
4 Apostles always use the language of their people
5 Moses sent to Pharaoh and his people
6-8 His message to the children of Israel
9-13 Former prophets were rejected in spite of their miracles
13-14 Miracles only possible by the will of God
15 The prophets suffer persecution with resignation
16 The unbelievers determine to expel their prophets out of the land
17 God reveals to them the overthrow of the wicked
18 Infidels fail of success through the prayers of the apostles
19-21 The doom of the unbelievers
22-23 God able to destroy the infidels and to create others in their stead
24-25 Idolatrous leaders will confess themselves unable to assist their deluded followers in the day of judgment
26-27 Even Satan will desert idolaters in hell
28 The reward of the righteous in Paradise
29-32 Parables of the good and evil tree
33-35 The idolaters threatened with hell-fire
35-36 True believers exhorted to steadfastness and prayer
37 Manifold favours of God to mankind
38-41 Abraham prays for himself and children that they may be kept from idolatry
42 He asks pardon for himself and his parents
43-46 God is not regardless of what infidels do, and will certainly punish them
47-48 The subtle plotting of the unbelievers will be brought to confusion
49 The earth and heavens to be changed at the resurrection
50-51 The dreadful doom of the wicked
52 Warning intended to lead men to the true God

Name
This chapter's name is Surah Ibrahim (Arabic) or Chapter of Abraham (English). Surahs of the Quran are not always named after their thematic content, but in this case a large section of the surah (ayat 35–41) focus on a prayer of Abraham's, which reveals the quality of Abraham's character.

Time of Revelation  
It shows up from the tone of the Surah that it has a place with that group of the Surahs which were revealed during the last phase of the Makkan time frame. For example, v. 13 "The disbelievers cautioned their Messengers, 'you will need to come back to our community or we will certainly remove you from our territory'" clearly shows that the mistreatment of the Muslims was at its peak at the hour of the revealing of this Surah, and the individuals of Makkah were set on ousting the Believers from that point like the disbelievers of the previous Prophets. That is the reason in v. 14 they have been cautioned, "We will annihilate these evildoers," and the Believers have been comforted similar to the believers before them, "and after them settle you in the land" Likewise the harsh admonition contained in the finishing up partition (vv. 43-52 likewise affirms that the Surah identifies with the last phase of the Makkan Period.)

Focal Theme  
This Surah is a caution and an admonition to the disbelievers who were dismissing the message of Muhammad and concocting cunning plans to crush his Mission. Be that as it may, notice, impugning, scold and rebuke overwhelm admonition. This is on the grounds that a decent arrangement of reprimand had just been made in the preceding Surahs, however notwithstanding this their stiff necked attitude, ill will, opposition, wickedness, abuse and so on had rather expanded.

References

External links 
Quran 14 Clear Quran translation
Q14:2, 50+ translations, islamawakened.com

Ibrahim
Abraham in Islam